The 1962–63 Iraq Central FA First Division was the 15th season of the Iraq Central FA League (the top division of football in Baghdad and its neighbouring cities from 1948 to 1973), and the first since its name was changed to First Division.

Seven teams competed in the tournament, which started on 8 November 1962 and ended in June 1963. It was played in a single round-robin format with each team playing each other once. Montakhab Al-Shorta won their first league title, clinching the title with a 1–0 win over Al-Quwa Al-Jawiya.

As league champions and runners-up respectively, Montakhab Al-Shorta and Al-Firqa Al-Thalitha played out the 1963 Iraq Central FA Altruism Cup, with Al-Firqa Al-Thalitha winning 1–0.

League table
The outcomes of Maslahat Naqil Al-Rukab's last two matches are not available.

Note: Before the start of the tournament, Amanat Al-Asima withdrew after the resignation of prominent club members and were subsequently relegated.

Results

References

External links
 Iraqi Football Website

Iraq Central FA League seasons
Iraq
1962 in Iraqi sport
1963 in Iraqi sport